Sanchore district is in the Indian state of Rajasthan. It is the headquarters of the Sanchore District located on National Highway 68. Sanchore was once known as Satyapur. Nearby villages include Sidheshwar ( away) Amli  ( away), Chitalvana  ( away)  and Dabhal ( away).

Economy
 many infrastructure projects were in progress in Sanchor. Oil exploration company Cairn Energy, discovered  of crude oil in the Barmer-Sanchore basin in 2010.  The Narmada Canal, which begins in Gujarat, enters Rajasthan state near the village Silu in Sachore tehsil, after passing through  in Gujarat.

Pathmeda village near Sanchore has Gopal Govardhan Gaushala, the largest Gaushala in India.

Demographics
, Sanchore had a population of 487458 (254057 Males constitute the population and 233401 are females. Males constituted 52.1% of the population. Sanchore has an average literacy rate of 56.18%, lower than the average literacy rate of Rajasthan is 66.11%.  Male literacy is 58.77% and female literacy is 32.18%. 15.98 percent of Sanchore's population is under six years of age.

Transport
Road Transport 

National Highway  68

The highway starting from its junction with NH-70 near Tanot connecting Ramgarh, Bhadasar, Jaisalmer, Barmer, Sanchor in the State of Rajasthan, Tharad, Bhabar, Radhanpur, Kamalpur, Khakhal, Roda, Dunawada, Patan, Chanasma, Mahesana, Kherva, Gojariya, Sama, Churada, Kuvadara and terminating at its junction with NH-48 near Prantij in the State of Gujarat.

Narmada Canal
The main canal, major and secondary distributaries supply an area of  serving 124 villages in the Sanchore and Barmer districts.

Railways
The stations nearest to Sanchore are Raniwara,  on State Highway 11; Dhanera,  on MRD No 108; Bhinmal,  on State Highway No 11.

References

Cities and towns in Jalore district